Barbara Neustadt (1922–1998) was  an American printmaker and book artist. She is known for her lithograph prints.

Biography
Neustadt was born in 1922 in Davenport, Iowa. She studied at Smith College. She worked at Atelier 17 when it was located in New York City. In New York she also with fellow printmakers Robert Blackburn, Margaret Lowengrund, and Michael Ponce de Leon. In 1967, she established the Studio Graphics Workshop in Woodstock, New York and in 1980 she established the Pleiades Press. In 1986, she created the artist's book A Dream of Love with the poet Joseph Langland. She died in 1998 in Bradenton Beach, Florida.

Neustadt's work is in the National Gallery of Art, the National Museum of Women in the Arts, the Syracuse University Art Museum, and the Walker Art Center.

References

1922 births
1998 deaths
American women printmakers
Women book artists
20th-century American women artists
People from Davenport, Iowa
American lithographers
Artists from Florida
Artists from New York (state)
Smith College alumni